Timothy Cheruiyot (born 20 November 1995) is a Kenyan middle-distance runner specialising in the 1500 metres. He is the 2020 Tokyo Olympic silver medallist in the event. At the World Athletics Championships, Cheruiyot won the silver medal in 2017 in London, and a gold in 2019 in Doha.

He took the silver medal in his specialty event at the 2018 and 2022 Commonwealth Games, and is also a two-time African Championship silver medallist from 2016 and 2018. Cheruiyot won the 1500 m Diamond League title on four occasions: in 2017, 2018, 2019, and 2021.

Career

Early Career: 2014-2016

World Championship

Achievements

International competitions

Diamond League wins and titles

National championships

Personal Bests and World Rankings

Personal Bests 
 800 metres – 1:43.11 (Nairobi 2019)
 1500 metres – 3:28.28 (Monaco 2021)
 One mile – 3:49.64 (Eugene, OR 2017)
 2000 metres – 5:03.05 (Nairobi 2020)
 5000 metres – 13:47.2 (Nairobi 2020)

Progression

World Rankings

References

External links

 

1995 births
Living people
Kenyan male middle-distance runners
World Athletics Championships athletes for Kenya
Place of birth missing (living people)
World Athletics Championships medalists
Commonwealth Games medallists in athletics
Commonwealth Games silver medallists for Kenya
Athletes (track and field) at the 2018 Commonwealth Games
World Athletics Championships winners
Diamond League winners
Athletes (track and field) at the 2020 Summer Olympics
Olympic athletes of Kenya
Medalists at the 2020 Summer Olympics
Olympic silver medalists for Kenya
Olympic silver medalists in athletics (track and field)
21st-century Kenyan people
Medallists at the 2018 Commonwealth Games